It's Frightening is the second album by the American indie rock band, the White Rabbits.  It was released May 19, 2009 on TBD Records, with "Percussion Gun" being the first single.

The album was produced by Britt Daniel of Spoon and mixed by Mike McCarthy.

The songs "Right Where They Left" and "Percussion Gun" were used in the teen drama Gossip Girl (episode title: Dr. Estrangeloved). "Percussion Gun" was also featured on EA Sports game, 2010 FIFA World Cup South Africa.

Track listing
 "Percussion Gun" (3:08)
 "Rudie Fails" (3:24)
 "They Done Wrong / We Done Wrong" (4:30)
 "Lionesse" (3:10)
 "Company I Keep" (4:10)
 "The Salesman (Tramp Life)" (2:50)
 "Midnight and I" (3:34)
 "Right Where They Left" (3:29)
 "The Lady Vanishes" (3:29)
 "Leave It at the Door" (3:00)

References

External links
 White Rabbits official site
 White Rabbits Interview nthWORD Magazine

2009 albums
White Rabbits (band) albums
Mute Records albums
TBD Records albums